The Chicago High School for Agricultural Sciences (CHSAS) is a public 4–year magnet high school located in the Mount Greenwood neighborhood on the far south side of Chicago, Illinois, United States.  The school is operated by the Chicago Public Schools district.  CHSAS opened for the 1985–86 school year in August 1985. The school is located on a  campus,  of which are dedicated to a working farm (it was built on the site of the last farm to survive within the Chicago city limits), and the students commute from all across the city to CHSAS.

History
Opened in 1985 by the Chicago Public Schools as a unique, experimental high school devoted to teaching agricultural science to urban students. It is located in the Mount Greenwood neighborhood of the city.  The students benefit from hands-on experience and summer internships, and many do go on to attend universities and major in agricultural disciplines. It was the second high school of this kind to open in the United States.

Academics
All students are members of the FFA (formerly Future Farmers of America), the school's motto is that of FFA.  The school claims that it is the organization's largest Illinois chapter, and the fifth largest in the nation.

Athletics
CHSAS competes in the Chicago Public League and is a member of the Illinois High School Association (IHSA). Teams are stylized as the Cyclones. The girls' basketball team were Class A Regional champions in 2003–04. The boys' golf team were Class AA and Public League champions in 2000–01.

Student life
In 2012, CHSAS began a partnership with The Nature Conservancy's Leaders in Environmental Action for the Future (LEAF) program. This program offers paid internships to a select number of students from CHSAS and helps staff develop resources. The school sponsors six sports for young men and women, an additional four for young men, and an additional five for young women.  The school also sponsors athletes who compete in the Special Olympics. The school also sponsors 17 extracurricular clubs and activities.  Those that are chapters of nationally notable organizations include the National Honor Society (NHS).

References

1985 establishments in Illinois
Agriculture in Illinois
Educational institutions established in 1985
Magnet schools in Illinois
Public high schools in Chicago
Agricultural schools
National FFA Organization